Pierre-Philippe Joncas (born August 14, 1985) is a Canadian pair skater.

Early in his pairs career, Joncas competed with Nathalie Gendron. He teamed up with Emilie Demers Boutin in July 2004. They competed on both the Senior and Junior Grand Prix in the 2006/2007 season, qualifying for the Junior Grand Prix Final and placing 8th at the Cup of China.

References

External links
 

1985 births
Canadian male pair skaters
Living people
People from Gaspé, Quebec
20th-century Canadian people
21st-century Canadian people